Kociniak is a surname. Notable people with the surname include: 

Jan Kociniak (1937–2007), Polish actor
Marian Kociniak (1936–2016), Polish actor

Polish-language surnames